Francisco Ortiz de la Renta (c. 1726 – c. 1806) was a Teniente a guerra Mayor of Ponce, Puerto Rico, from 1 January 1766 to 31 December 1800, when José Benítez took over the mayoral administration.

Background
Francisco Ortiz de la Renta was a descendant of the founder of San Germán, on the hills of Santa Marta, next to Río Guanajibo, in 1573.<ref>Francisco Lluch Mora. Orígenes y Fundación de Ponce, y otras noticias relativas a su desarrollo urbano, demográfico y cultural (Siglos XVI-XIX). San Juan, Puerto Rico: Editorial Plaza Mayor. Segunda Edición. 2006. p. 39.</ref> As teniente a guerra, he was the administrative head of the municipality.

See also

 List of Puerto Ricans
 List of mayors of Ponce, Puerto Rico

Notes

References

Further reading
 Ramon Marin. Las Fiestas Populares de Ponce.'' Editorial Universidad de Puerto Rico. 1994.

External links
 Guardia Civil española (c. 1898) (Includes military ranks in 1880s Spanish Empire.)

Mayors of Ponce, Puerto Rico
1720s births
1800s deaths
Year of death uncertain
Year of birth uncertain